Shamshi-Adad V was the King of Assyria from 824 to 811 BC. He was named after the god Adad, who is also known as Hadad.

Family
Shamshi-Adad was a son and successor of King Shalmaneser III, the husband of Queen Shammuramat (by some identified with the mythical Semiramis), and the father of Adad-nirari III, who succeeded him as king.

He was also a grandfather of Shalmaneser IV.

Reign 
The first years of Shamshi-Adad's reign saw a serious struggle for the succession of the aged Shalmaneser.

The revolt was led by Shamshi-Adad's brother Assur-danin-pal, and had broken out already by 826 BC. The rebellious brother, according to Shamshi-Adad's own inscriptions, succeeded in bringing to his side 27 important cities, including Nineveh. The rebellion lasted until 820 BC, weakening the Assyrian empire and its ruler; this weakness continued to reverberate in the kingdom until the reforms of Tiglath-Pileser III.

Later in his reign, Shamshi-Adad campaigned against Southern Mesopotamia, and stipulated a treaty with the Babylonian king Marduk-zakir-shumi I.

In 814 BC, he won the Battle of Dur-Papsukkal against the Babylonian king Marduk-balassu-iqbi, and a few Aramean tribes settled in Babylonia. The extent of Shamshi-Adad's victory was such that he obtained the submission of the Babylonian king and, after obtaining booty from several Babylonian cities, he returned to Assyria with palace treasures and gods (i.e. the sacred representation of the gods).

See also
Stela of Shamshi-Adad V

Notes 

811 BC deaths
9th-century BC Assyrian kings
Year of birth unknown